Hellamaa is a village in Hiiumaa Parish, Hiiu County in northwestern Estonia.

The village is first mentioned in 1565 (Hellemaa, or Hallemäky wacka), or 1798 (Hellama). Historically, the village was part of Suuremõisa Manor.

References
 

Villages in Hiiu County